Vogüé is a commune in the Ardèche department in southern France.

Geography
Vogüé is located along the banks of the river Ardèche.

Population

See also
Communes of the Ardèche department

References

Communes of Ardèche
Plus Beaux Villages de France
Ardèche communes articles needing translation from French Wikipedia